Farewell is an unincorporated community in southern Oregon County, in the U.S. state of Missouri.

The community is on Missouri Route V approximately eight miles east of Thayer. It is one-half mile north of the Missouri-Arkansas state line. The community of Jeff is 1.5 miles to the west on Route V and Myrtle is five miles to the east.

History
A post office called Farewell was established in 1912, and remained in operation until 1927. The name "Farewell" was assigned to the place by postal authorities.

References

Unincorporated communities in Oregon County, Missouri
Unincorporated communities in Missouri